RMS Ben-my-Chree may refer to:
Six ships of the Isle  of Man Steam Packet Company:
 
 
 
 
  (1998)

Packet (sea transport)